Rexhep Mitrovica (15 January 1888 – 21 May 1967) was a Prime Minister of Albania's government under Nazi Germany. A staunch nationalist, he was elected head of the Second League of Prizren.

Biography

Early life

Rexhep was born to a wealthy land-owning family from Mitroviça (currently Mitrovica, Kosovo), in the Ottoman Empire. He studied in Usküb and Istanbul. He was one of the leaders of the Kosovo uprising of 1912, together with Isa Boletini and Hasan Prishtina. Also in 1912, he took part in the declaration of Albanian independence as the representative of Peja.  From 1921 to 1923, he served as Albanian minister of education.

By 1921, Kosovo was within the Kingdom of Serbs, Croats and Slovenes against the will of the Albanian population majority. Albanian resistance had been largely crushed in Drenica in November 1920. The Serbian government's Decree on the Colonization of the New Southern Lands was now facilitating the takeover by Serb colonists of large Ottoman estates and of land seized from Albanian rebels. It is within this context that Rexhep Mitrovica, along with Bedri Pejani, tried to seek help from the western powers.

After the fall of the government of Fan Noli in December 1924, he took part in a failed plot to overthrow Ahmet Zogu, spent a couple of years in exile in Austria and France, but was amnestied with seventy other figures on 21 September 1927.

He returned to Albania after the Italian invasion and joined the Balli Kombëtar resistance movement in 1942. He spent much of the Italian period in prison in Porto Romano near Durrës.

Prime minister
After the capitulation of Italy, Rexhep Mitrovica was head of the Second League of Prizren, which supported Greater Albania, i.e., unification of all territories with substantial Albanian population. After German occupation of Albania, on 6 November 1943, Berlin announced that the regents and the assembly had formed a government headed by Rexhep Mitrovica, an active member of the Balli Kombëtar from Kosovo. Mitrovica's cabinet, most of whom had credentials as nationalists as well as some German or Austrian connection, included Xhafer Deva, who had studied at the Robert College of Istanbul and in Vienna, as minister of the interior and Rrok Kolaj, a Catholic from Shkodër who had studied at the University of Graz, as minister of Justice. Austrian educated Vehbi Frasheri was appointed as foreign minister. The Orthodox Elbasaner, Sokrat Dodbiba, the nephew of Lef Nosi, became minister of finance.

In his first address to the National Assembly, Mitrovica noted that four and a half years of Italian domination had left anarchy and chaos in Albania. The pre-1939 state apparatus had been completely dismantled. The Italians had destroyed the army, the gendarmerie, the police, and the Foreign Ministry; they had changed the flag, altered personal greetings, renamed cities, and even reassigned family names. To reestablish the state, Mitrovica set down an ambitious plan that included reestablishing local government on the pre-1939 basis, gaining foreign recognition, reorganizing the economy, introducing effective agrarian reform, and creating a military force. The general goal of the government, and this was repeated at every available opportunity, was to protect Albania's territorial integrity within its ethnic borders. With the land reforms for the peasants and a very effective German propaganda emphasizing the return of Kosovo, the Germans managed to extract considerable support from the regime.

With control over Kosovo and the creation of an Independent State of Albania, Mitrovica exacted revenge on the Serb colonists, killing and expelling thousands of Serbs.

On 18 July 1944 Rexhep Mitrovica resigned due to illness. Hermann Neubacher, Hitler's political expert for Balkan problems, came to Tirana and persuaded Fiqri Dine to form the next government

Exile and death
During the communist takeover in November 1944, though he was ill with tuberculosis, he managed to escape to Croatia with Xhafer Deva and Rexhep Krasniqi, and in December of that year carried on over the mountains to Austria to reach Vienna. With Deva’s assistance, the ailing Mitrovica spent time in a sanatorium in Feldkirch in western Austria. In 1947, he accompanied Deva and Krasniqi to Genoa where, with the help of a Turkish diplomat of Albanian origin, he was able to immigrate to Turkey. He died at the German hospital in Istanbul as head of the Albanian community in exile.

His grandson, Redjep Mitrovitsa is an actor of Comédie-Française.

Quotes
Mitrovica identified the Albanian communists as un-Albanian since he argues that:
"Albanians, as Aryans of Illyrian heritage, could not ignore tradition and would be saved from the hydra of communism."

Sources
Owen Pearson, Albania and King Zog: Independence, republic and monarchy 1908-1939, London, Tauris, 2004, .
Owen Pearson, Albania in occupation and war: From fascism to communism, 1940-1945, London, Tauris, 2005, .

References

See also
 History of Albania
 List of prime ministers of Albania

1888 births
1967 deaths
Politicians from Mitrovica, Kosovo
Albanian Muslims
Government ministers of Albania
Prime Ministers of Albania
Balli Kombëtar
Albanian collaborators with Fascist Italy
Albanian collaborators with Nazi Germany
Albanian anti-communists
Albanian people of World War II
All-Albanian Congress delegates
Signatories of the Albanian Declaration of Independence
Second Congress of Manastir delegates